August Pictures (Chinese: 堂堂映画; pinyin:  táng táng yìng huà) is an independent television production company based in Singapore since 2007. It has produced award-winning programmes, from documentaries like Workman Diaries (2018), A Medical Journey (2019) and Cooking For a Cause (2021), to dramas such as Beijing to Moscow (2019), The Driver (2019), Mind's Eye (2020), Teenage Textbook: The Series (2021) and Crouching Tiger Hidden Ghost (2021).

Television Works

Docuseries

Drama series

Infotainment

Awards and nominations

Asian Academy Creative Awards

New York Festival TV & Film Awards

References

External links 
 Official website

Television production companies
Mass media companies of Singapore
Singaporean companies established in 2007